Ezhandha Kadhal is a 1941 Indian Tamil-language film directed by K. S. Mani. The film stars N. S. Krishnan, T. A. Mathuram, T. Premavathi and K. P. Kamakshi.

Plot
A rich man on his death bed gave 5000 rupees to  his trusted friend and asked him to take care of his motherless daughter Padma and to marry her to Jagadish when she comes to the right age. The friend, Somanathan Pillai undertakes his friend's request. Padma comes to live with Somanathan Pillai's family. Jayapalan, a son of Somanathan Pillai, likes Padma. They become lovers. However, Somanathan Pillai forcibly marries Padma to Jagdish as per his dead friend's wish. He also finds another bride, Saroja, for Jayapalan. But then both Jayapalan and Padma are not happy in their respective married lives. Jayapalan becomes a drunkard and loses eyesight on a stormy night. A sacred sadhu enters the scene. How he solves all the problems forms the rest of the story.

Cast
List adapted from the song book

 N. S. Krishnan as Venu
 T. A. Mathuram as Veni
 T. P. Ponnusami Pillai as Somanatha Pillai
 K. P. Kamakshi as Jagadish
 O. N. Kittu as Jayapal
 C. S. Jayaraman as Sadhu
 T. R. Ramasami as Astrologer
 P. A. Subbaiah Pillai as Sundaram Pillai
 N. S. Velappan as Rajaram

 P. G. Kuppusami as Sivakozhandhu
 E. Krishnamurthi as Music Teacher
 P. V. Chinnasami as Narendran
 Master Radhakrishnan as Gopal
 M. Raghavan as Shankaran
 Chellappa as Beggar Boy
 T. Premavathi as Padma
 M. R. Mangalam as Saroja

Production
The film was produced by N. S. Krishnan under his own banner Asoka Films and was directed by K. S. Mani who was a member of the N. S. Krishnan's unit. Cinematography was handled by E. R. Cooper while the editing was done by Surya. The film was shot at Central Studios, Coimbatore.

Another film Chandrahari was packaged together as Part 2 with this Part 1 film.

Soundtrack
Music was composed by N. S. Balakrishnan and K. M. Gowrisan. N. S. Krishnan, T. A. Mathuram and C. S. Jayaraman sang the songs.

Reception
Film historian Randor Guy wrote in 2014 that the film is "Remembered for the melodramatic storyline, pleasing music rendered by C. S. Jayaraman and comedy sequences of NSK and Mathuram.

References

1941 films
1941 drama films
Indian drama films
Indian black-and-white films
Indian films based on plays
Films directed by K. S. Mani